"Snake in the Grass" is a song by Dave Dee, Dozy, Beaky, Mick & Tich, released as a single in May 1969. Like with the previous single, "Don Juan", it peaked at number 23 on the UK Singles Chart.

Release and reception
"Snake in the Grass" was the group's last single before the departure of Dave Dee in September 1969, after which the remaining members performed as D.B.M. & T.

Reviewing for Record Mirror, Peter Jones described "Snake in the Grass" as "somewhat of a less ambitious sort of production for the consistent team. But it's extremely catchy in a lilting, fast-paced way" and that "though there is less happening in the arrangement, this stands out as one of their most directly commercial numbers ever". For New Musical Express, Derek Johnson described the song as a "complete contrast from their recent releases – a light and fluffy number, with a suggestion of a rocksteady beat.

In May 1969, a cover version by session musicians featuring Elton John on vocals was released on the compilation album Top of the Pops Vol. 5 by the budget label Hallmark. This version would later appear on John's 1994 compilation album Chartbusters Go Pop.

Track listing
 "Snake in the Grass" – 3:05
 "Bora Bora" – 2:14

Charts

References

1969 singles
1969 songs
Fontana Records singles
Songs written by Alan Blaikley
Songs written by Ken Howard (composer)
Song recordings produced by Steve Rowland